The Chelmsford Stakes is a Tattersalls Club Group 2 Thoroughbred horse race run over 1600 metres at Weight for Age at Randwick Racecourse, Sydney, Australia in September. Prize money is A$250,000.

History

The race was first run in 1895.

Grade
 1895–1979 - Principal Race
 1980 onwards - Group 2

Venue

 1983 - Warwick Farm
 1984–1999 - Randwick
 2000 - Rosehill  
 2001–2003 - Randwick
 2004 - Warwick Farm
 2005–2010 - Randwick
 2011–2012 - Warwick Farm
 2013 onwards - Randwick

Distance

 1895–1971 - 9 furlongs (~1800 metres)
 1972–1982 – 1800 metres
 1983 – 1600 metres
 1984 – 1800 metres
 1985–1999 – 1600 metres
 2000 – 1500 metres
 2001 – 1400 metres
 2002–2005 – 1600 metres
 2006 – 1550 metres
 2008 onwards - 1600 metres

1926 & 1945 Racebooks

Gallery of noted winners

Winners

 2022 - Knights Order
 2021 - Think It Over 
 2020 - Mister Sea Wolf 
 2019 - Samadoubt 
 2018 - Unforgotten 
 2017 - Winx 
 2016 - Hartnell 
 2015 - Complacent 
 2014 - Hawkspur
 2013 - Hawkspur
 2012 - Danleigh
 2011 - Trusting
 2010 - Theseo
 2009 - O'Lonhro
 2008 - Gallant Tess
 2007 - †race not held
 2006 - Eremein
 2005 - Nevis
 2004 - Unearthly
 2003 - Lonhro
 2002 - Lonhro
 2001 - Brave Prince
 2000 - Pasta Express
 1999 - Intergaze
 1998 - Might and Power
 1997 - Juggler
 1996 - Filante
 1995 - Oppressor
 1994 - March Hare
 1993 - Soho Square
 1992 - Dr. Grace
 1991 - Stargazer
 1990 - Stargazer
 1989 - High Regard
 1988 - Sky Chase
 1987 - Campaign King
 1986 - Shankhill Lass
 1985 - Lord Of Camelot
 1984 - Hayai
 1983 - Emancipation
 1982 - Rare Form
 1981 - Kingston Town
 1980 - Kingston Town
 1979 - Mighty Kingdom
 1978 - Ming Dynasty
 1977 - Flirting Prince
 1976 - Purple Patch
 1975 - Leica Lover
 1974 - Passetreul
 1973 - Longfella
 1972 - Turbino
 1971 - Tails
 1970 - Gunsynd
 1969 - Roman Consul
 1968 - Roman Consul
 1967 - Roman Consul
 1966 - Trevors
 1965 - Pyramus
 1964 - Summer Fair
 1963 - Maidenhead
 1962 - Burgos
 1961 - Sharply
 1960 - Tulloch
 1959 - Pique
 1958 - Prince Darius
 1957 - Prince Darius
 1956 - Advocate
 1955 - Electro
 1954 - Prince Cortauld
 1953 - Royal Stream
 1952 - Delta
 1951 - Delta
 1950 - Delta
 1949 - Columnist
 1948 - Bernbrook
 1947 - Proctor
 1946 - Bernborough
 1945 - Sleepy Fox
 1944 - Veiled Threat
 1943 - Tribal
 1942 - Rimveil
 1941 - Beau Vite
 1940 - Beaulivre
 1939 - Defaulter
 1938 - Royal Chief
 1937 - Mala
 1936 - Gold Rod
 1935 - Sylvandale
 1934 - Rogilla
 1933 - Rogilla
 1932 - Gaine Carrington
 1931 - Ammon Ra
 1930 - Phar Lap
 1929 - Mollison
 1928 - Limerick
 1927 - Limerick
 1926 - Limerick
 1925 - Windbag
 1924 - Heroic
 1923 - Rapine
 1922 - Beauford
 1921 - Syce Knight
 1920 - Chrysolaus
 1919 - Richmond Main
 1918 - Gloaming
 1917 - Prince Viridis
 1916 - Sasanof
 1915 - Garlin
 1914 - Woorak
 1913 - Duke Foote
 1912 - Duke Foote
 1911 - Los Angelos
 1910 - Prince Foote
 1909 - Prince Foote
 1908 - Perkeo
 1907 - Mountain King
 1906 - Solution
 1905 - Marvel Loch
 1904 - Warroo
 1903 - Duke Of Grafton
 1902 - Abundance
 1901 - Sir Leonard
 1900 - Dandy
 1899 - The Chief
 1898 - The Chief
 1897 - Amberite
 1896 - Hopscotch
 1895 - Newman

† Not held because of outbreak of equine influenza

See also
 List of Australian Group races
 Group races

References

Horse races in Australia
Open mile category horse races
Randwick Racecourse